Yakeen may refer to:

 Yakeen, a 1969 Indian film directed by Brij
 Yakeen, a 2005 Bollywood thriller film directed by Girish Dhamija